Alexandru Lazăr (20 February 1991) is a Romanian footballer who plays as a midfielder for Spanish club Recambios Colón.

Honours

ACS Poli Timișoara
Liga II: 2014–15

References

External links

Profile at liga1.ro

Footballers from Bucharest
Romanian emigrants to France
1991 births
Living people
Romanian footballers
Association football midfielders
Liga I players
Liga II players
FC Steaua II București players
FC Viitorul Constanța players
ACS Poli Timișoara players
LPS HD Clinceni players
CS Concordia Chiajna players
FC Metaloglobus București players
Serie C players
A.C.R. Messina players
Ontinyent CF players
Romanian expatriate footballers
Expatriate footballers in Italy
Romanian expatriate sportspeople in Italy
Expatriate footballers in Spain
Romanian expatriate sportspeople in Spain